"Baby Jaan" is a Bengali song from the 2018 Indo-Bangladeshi romantic drama film, Bhaijaan Elo Re. Written and produced by Dolaan-Mainnakk, the song is sung by Nakash Aziz & Antara Mitra. The music video of the track features Bangladeshi Superstar actor Shakib Khan and Tollywood actresses Srabanti Chatterjee and Payel Sarkar. The music video is choreographed by Adil Sheikh and edited by Ravi Ranjan Moitra.

Release and response 
The song was released on 12 May 2018 in the banner of Eskay Music. The song performed by Nakash Aziz & Antara Mitra. The track featured Shakib Khan & actress Srabanti Chatterjee and Payel Sarkar. The music video was shot in West Bengal and some exotic locations in London. The video received an overwhelming response on YouTube and creating record of becoming the fastest Bengali language video track to reach 1 million (10 Lac) views within 24 Hours.

See also
 Shakib Khan
 Nakash Aziz
 Joydip Mukherjee
 Eskay Movies

References

External links
 Baby Jaan song Lyrics
 

Indian film songs
2018 songs
Bengali film songs
Bengali-language songs
2018 singles
Antara Mitra songs
Nakash Aziz songs